Irene Tedrow (August 3, 1907 – March 10, 1995) was an American character actress in stage, film, television and radio.

Among her most notable roles are as Janet Archer in the radio series Meet Corliss Archer, Mrs. Lucy Elkins on the TV sitcom Dennis the Menace, and as Mrs. Webb in the stage production Our Town at the Plumstead Playhouse.

Stage
Tedrow studied with Ben Iden Payne, who directed the Memorial Theater at Stratford-on-Avon, in England. She also had three seasons' experience with Maurice Evans's troupe in New York City and touring nationally. In 1931, she was a member of the Chautauqua Repertory Theater.

Tedrow was a founding member of San Diego's  Old Globe Theater and was cast as an ingénue in the beginning of her career. In 1934, she portrayed eighteen characters in multiple adaptations of Shakespearean plays at The Old Globe during the Chicago Fair. She later joined Orson Welles' Mercury Theater. She appeared on Broadway even through her eighties, in King Richard III (1937), Hamlet (1938-1939), King Henry IV, Part I (1939), Our Town (1969) and Pygmalion.

Television
One of Tedrow's earliest roles as a regular cast member on a television program was that of Mrs. Ruggles on the first season of The Ruggles (1949-1950). In 1959 Tedrow played a small part as Mrs Adams in Maverick (TV series) in an episode called "Gun Shy". She had a recurring role as Mrs. Elkins on the Dennis the Menace television sitcom from 1959 to 1963. In 1966 she appeared in The Addams Family as the taciturn governess Miss Thudd ("Just call me Thudd"). As a character actor she appeared in many shows, including Lux Video Theatre, Jefferson Drum, The Real McCoys, Rawhide, Mannix, The Twilight Zone and The Andy Griffith Show. In 1955, she appeared on The Jack Benny Program as a contestant with Jack Benny on a mock You Bet Your Life segment with Groucho Marx.

In the early 1960s, Tedrow made two guest appearances on Perry Mason, including the role of Amy Douglas in "The Case of the Ominous Outcast", and a role in Bonanza in the episode "Abner Willoughby's Return". Later she would also appear in Dundee and the Culhane, Diff'rent Strokes, The Rockford Files, Facts of Life, Three's Company and two episodes of The Mary Tyler Moore Show as Congresswoman Margaret Geddes. In 1976, Tedrow played Mary Ludlow Hall, Eleanor Roosevelt's grandmother in Eleanor and Franklin.

Radio
Tedrow's work in radio dated back at least to 1929. As a drama student at Carnegie Institute of Technology, she was master of ceremonies and student director for "Carnegie Tech Day at Gimbel's," which was broadcast on WCAE. A 1937 radio listing shows her as one of the actresses in George Bernard Shaw's Back to Methuselah when it was broadcast on NBC Blue.

During the 1940s and 1950s, Tedrow had quality acting roles in radio productions, including The Baby Snooks Show. Tedrow appeared in the 09/06/1954 episode of Gunsmoke "The Promise" (a.k.a. "The Handcuffs").  Her roles included those shown in the table below.

Source: On the Air: The Encyclopedia of Old-Time Radio except as noted.

Recognition
Tedrow's performance in Eleanor and Franklin garnered her one of the first Primetime Emmy Award nominations for "Best Supporting Actress in a Television Comedy or Drama Special". ("Outstanding Single Performance by a Supporting Actress in Comedy or Drama Special - 1976" per the Emmy Awards website) In 1979, she received her second Emmy Award nomination (Outstanding Lead Actress for a Single Appearance in a drama or comedy series) for her role in James at 15.

Personal life
Tedrow was married to William Kent, who originally had come to the United States as a refugee from Nazi Germany. The couple had two children, Roger and Enid.

Death
On March 10, 1995, Tedrow died from stroke complications in Hollywood at age 87. Her grave is located at Westwood Village Memorial Park Cemetery.

Selected Radiography

Filmography

Film

Television

Award nominations

References

Sources

External links

 
 

1907 births
1995 deaths
American founders
Actresses from Denver
American film actresses
American radio actresses
American stage actresses
American television actresses
Burials at Westwood Village Memorial Park Cemetery
Actresses from Los Angeles
20th-century American actresses